The 2019 NCAA National Collegiate Women's Water Polo Championship was the 19th annual tournament to decide the championship of NCAA women's collegiate water polo. Two play-in games were held on May 7, with the winners advancing to the main tournament, May 10–12 at the Avery Aquatic Center in Stanford, California, hosted by Stanford University.

Qualification
The tournament was open to all programs from Divisions I, II, and III. Ten teams participated in the tournament: seven automatic bids and three at-large bids.

Bids

Tournament bracket
All times Eastern.

Game summaries

Play–in games

Quarterfinals

Semifinals

National Championship

Tournament awards

References

NCAA Women's Water Polo Championship
NCAA Women's Water Polo Championship
NCAA Women's Water Polo Championship
NCAA Women's Water Polo